"Cherry, Cherry" is a 1966 song written, composed, and recorded by American musician Neil Diamond.

Background
The song was recorded in February - March 1966, and was originally intended as a demo, arranged by Artie Butler and produced by Jeff Barry and Ellie Greenwich. It was issued as a 45 single in 1966 where Greenwich came up with the chorus and can be heard as the prominent background voice, accompanied by Jeff Barry. Diamond has stated that the song was inspired by an early relationship with a significantly older woman. Session guitarist Al Gorgoni (who later played on "The Sound of Silence" by Simon & Garfunkel and "Brown Eyed Girl" by Van Morrison) contributed to the song.
Rolling Stone would later label "Cherry, Cherry" as "one of the greatest three-chord songs of all time."

Reception
Billboard described the single as an "exciting production [which] features bass piano backing and choral support of Diamond's vocal work."  Cash Box said that it is a "lively, pulsating chorus-backed romancer with an infectious repeating riff" that is a "sure-fire blockbuster."

Chart performance
"Cherry, Cherry" was Diamond's first big hit, reaching #6 on both the Billboard Hot 100 chart, in October 1966, and the Cash Box chart.
In 1973, a live recording of "Cherry, Cherry" was issued as a 45 single from Diamond's live album Hot August Night (1972). The live version hit #24 on the Cash Box chart and #31 on the Billboard Hot 100 chart.  Billboard said that "the live sound and the bouncing arrangement makes it almost a different song" from the original studio version.

Two versions of "Cherry, Cherry" have been released. The version familiar to most listeners was recorded in late January 1966 and released by Bang Records in mid-1966, and was recorded as a demo, with Butler on keyboards, and Barry and Greenwich on backing vocals and hand-claps. The other version, with different lyrics and originally intended to be released as the single, was finally released by Diamond and Sony Music Entertainment in 1996 on the compilation album In My Lifetime.

Cover versions
 Dizzy Gillespie recorded a cover of this song for his 1966 LP, The Melody Lingers On (on Limelight Records).
 The Music Machine recorded a cover of this song on their 1966 LP, (Turn On) The Music Machine (on Original Sound).
 Joe Dassin recorded a cover of this song in French on his 1970 LP, Joe Dassin (La Fleur aux dents) (on CBS Disques).
 Jonathan King recorded a cover of this song in 1970 and it became a hit all over Europe, especially in the Netherlands, Belgium and France.
 Kramer recorded a Spanish cover of this song for his 2012 solo LP, The Brill Building (on Tzadik Records).

In popular culture
The song was used through the movie Saving Silverman, used in How to Make an American Quilt and in the introduction of the character Veronica Corningstone in Anchorman: The Legend of Ron Burgundy.

References

1966 songs
1966 singles
1973 singles
Neil Diamond songs
Jonathan King songs
Songs written by Neil Diamond
Bang Records singles